Eucalyptus baudiniana is a tree, rarely a mallee, that is endemic to Western Australia. It has rough bark on its trunk, smooth brownish bark above, narrow lance-shaped to curved adult leaves, oval buds in groups of seven to fifteen, white flowers and barrel-shaped fruit.

Description
It has rough, fibrous to flaky, dark grey bark on the trunk of the three which then becomes smooth and grey-brown on the branches. Adult leaves are arranged alternately and the same glossy green on both sides. It blooms between November and April producing white flowers.

Taxonomy and naming
Eucalyptus baudiniana was first formally described by Denis John Carr and Maisie Carr in 1976 in Proceedings of the Royal Society of Victoria. The specific epithet honours the navigator and explorer Nicholas Baudin.

E. baudiniana is part of the subgenus Symphyomyrtus section Dumaria in a sub-group of nine closely related species called series Ovulares. The rough barked members of this series include E. baudiniana, Eucalyptus aequioperta, Eucalyptus brachycorys, Eucalyptus myriadena and Eucalyptus ovularis and smooth barked members include; Eucalyptus cyclostoma, Eucalyptus cylindrocarpa, Eucalyptus exigua and Eucalyptus oraria.

Distribution and habitat
This eucalypt is found scattered along the west coast from near Kalbarri to the Yarra Yarra Lakes, Coomberdale and Perenjori, in the Gascoyne, Mid West and Wheatbelt regions of Western Australia. It grows in sandy to loamy and sometimes saline soils.

Conservation
Eucalyptus baudiniana is classified as "not threatened" by the Government of Western Australia Department of Parks and Wildlife.

See also
List of Eucalyptus species

References

Eucalypts of Western Australia
Trees of Australia
baudiniana
Myrtales of Australia
Plants described in 1976
Taxa named by Maisie Carr